Bretonside bus station was a bus station in Plymouth, England.

History 
The bus station opened in March 1958. In 2014, plans were put forward to redevelop the site of the bus station. In March 2015, the local planning committee agreed to demolish the bus station. Long-distance coach services were transferred to Plymouth coach station. Demolition began in October 2017.

Reception 
The station was noted for its lack of cleanliness and upkeep.

References 

Bus stations in England
Transport in Plymouth, Devon
Former bus stations
2016 disestablishments in England
1958 establishments in England
Buildings and structures in Plymouth, Devon
Demolished buildings and structures in England